The Diocese of San Vicente is a Latin Church ecclesiastical territory or diocese of the Catholic Church in El Salvador. It is a suffragan diocese in the ecclesiastical province of the metropolitan Archdiocese of San Salvador. The Diocese of San Vicente was erected on 18 December 1943.

Bishops

Ordinaries
Pedro Arnoldo Aparicio y Quintanilla, S.D.B. (1948–1983)
José Oscar Barahona Castillo (1983–2005)
José Luis Escobar Alas (2005–2008), appointed Archbishop of San Salvador
José Elías Rauda Gutiérrez, O.F.M. (since 2009)

Auxiliary bishops
José Oscar Barahona Castillo (1982–1983), appointed bishop here
José Luis Escobar Alas (2002–2005), appointed bishop here

Other priests of this diocese who became bishops
Fabio Reynaldo Colindres Abarca, appointed Bishop of the Military Ordinariate of El Salvador in 2008
Constantino Barrera Morales, appointed Bishop of Sonsonate in 2012

Territorial losses

External links and references

San Vicente
San Vicente
San Vicente
Roman Catholic Ecclesiastical Province of San Salvador